This is a listing of the horses that finished in either first, second, or third place and the number of starters in the Shine Again Stakes, an American stakes race for fillies and mares three years old and older at one mile and one sixteenth (8.5 furlongs) on the dirt held for Registered Maryland-breds at Pimlico Race Course in Baltimore, Maryland.  (List 2006–present)

See also 
 List of graded stakes at Pimlico Race Course

References

Pimlico Race Course
`